Khanmirza Rural District is in the Central District of Khanmirza County, Chaharmahal and Bakhtiari province, Iran. At the census of 2006, its population was 19,381 in 3,888 households, when it was in the former Khanmirza District of Lordegan County, and before the district was elevated to the status of a county. There were 18,891 inhabitants in 4,530 households at the following census of 2011; and in the most recent census of 2016, the population of the rural district was 20,337 in 5,388 households. The largest of its 24 villages was Do Makan, with 2,764 people.

References 

Khanmirza County

Rural Districts of Chaharmahal and Bakhtiari Province

Populated places in Chaharmahal and Bakhtiari Province

Populated places in Khanmirza County